A smile is a facial expression formed primarily by flexing the muscles at the sides of the mouth. Some smiles include a contraction of the muscles at the corner of the eyes, an action known as a Duchenne smile. 
Among humans, a smile expresses delight, sociability, happiness, joy, or amusement. It is distinct from a similar but usually involuntary expression of anxiety known as a grimace. Although cross-cultural studies have shown that smiling is a means of communication throughout the world, there are large differences among different cultures, religions, and societies, with some using smiles to convey confusion or embarrassment.

Evolutionary background 
Primatologist Signe Preuschoft traces the smile back over 30 million years of evolution to a "fear grin" stemming from monkeys and apes, who often used barely clenched teeth to portray to predators that they were harmless or to signal submission to more dominant group members. The smile may have evolved differently among species, especially among humans.

Social effects 
Smiling seems to have a favorable influence upon others and makes one likable and more approachable. In the social context, smiling and laughter have different functions in the order of sequence in social situations:
 Smiling is sometimes a pre-laughing device and is a common pattern for paving the way to laughter;
 Smiling can be used as a response to laughter.

Smiling is a signaling system that evolved from a need to communicate information in many different forms. One of these is an advertisement of sexual interest. Female smiles are appealing to heterosexual males, increasing physical attractiveness and enhancing sex appeal. However, recent research indicates a man's smile may or may not be most effective in attracting heterosexual women, and that facial expressions such as pride or even shame might be more effective. The researchers did not explicitly study the role of smiles in other sexual preferences.

As reinforcement and manipulation 
The influence of smiling on others is not necessarily benign. It may take the form of positive reinforcement, possibly for an underhand manipulative and abusive purpose.

Cultural differences 
While smiling is perceived as a positive emotion most of the time, there are many cultures that perceive smiling as a negative expression and consider it unwelcoming. Too much smiling can be viewed as a sign of shallowness or dishonesty. In some parts of Asia, people may smile when they are embarrassed or in emotional pain. Some people may smile at others to indicate a friendly greeting. A smile may be reserved for close friends and family members. Many people in the former Soviet Union area consider smiling at strangers in public to be unusual and even suspicious behavior, or even a sign of stupidity.

Systematic large cross-cultural study on social perception of smiling individuals documented that in some cultures a smiling individual may be perceived as less intelligent than the same non-smiling individual (and that cultural uncertainty avoidance may explain these differences). Furthermore, the same study showed that corruption at the societal level may undermine the prosocial perception of smiling—in societies with high corruption indicators, trust toward smiling individuals is reduced.

There can also be gender differences. In the United States and Canada, women report men's telling them to smile. For example, Greg Rickford, a member of the Canadian Parliament told a female journalist to smile rather than answer the question she had asked. Biological anthropologist Helen Fisher states that, while this could be either caring or controlling behavior, such behavior is unlikely to be welcome.

Dimples 

Cheek dimples are formed secondary to a bifid zygomaticus major muscle, whose fascial strands insert into the dermis and cause a dermal tethering effect.  Dimples are genetically inherited and are a dominant trait. Having bilateral dimples (dimples in both cheeks) is the most common form of cheek dimples. A rarer form is the single dimple, which occurs on one side of the face only.

This bifid variation of the muscle originates as a single structure from the zygomatic bone. As it travels anteriorly, it then divides with a superior bundle that inserts in the typical position above the corner of the mouth. An inferior bundle inserts below the corner of the mouth. Dimples are analogous and how they form in cheeks varies from person to person. The shape of a person's face can affect the look and form as well: leptoprosopic (long and narrow) faces have long and narrow dimples, and eryprosopic (short and broad) faces have short, circular dimples. People with a mesoprosopic face are more likely to have dimples in their cheeks than any other face shape.

Duchenne smile 

While conducting research on the physiology of facial expressions in the mid-19th century, French neurologist Guillaume Duchenne identified two distinct types of smiles. A Duchenne smile involves contraction of both the zygomatic major muscle (which raises the corners of the mouth) and the orbicularis oculi muscle (which raises the cheeks and forms crow's feet around the eyes). The Duchenne smile has been described as "smizing", as in "smiling with the eyes". An exaggerated Duchenne smile is sometimes associated with lying.

Non-Duchenne smile 
A non-Duchenne smile involves only the zygomatic major muscle. According to Messenger et. al. "Research with adults initially indicated that joy was indexed by generic smiling, any smiling involving the raising of the lip corners by the zygomatic major .... More recent research suggests that smiling in which the muscle around the eye contracts, raising the cheeks high (Duchenne smiling), is uniquely associated with positive emotion."

The "Pan Am smile", also known as the "Botox smile", is the name given to a fake smile, in which only the zygomatic major muscle is voluntarily contracted to show politeness. It is named after the now-defunct airline Pan American World Airways, whose flight attendants would always flash every passenger the same perfunctory smile. Botox was introduced for cosmetic use in 2002. Chronic use of Botox injections to deal with eye wrinkle can result in the paralysis of the small muscles around the eyes, preventing the appearance of a Duchenne smile.

In animals 

In animals, the baring of teeth is often used as a threat or warning display—known as a snarl—or a sign of submission. For chimpanzees, it can also be a sign of fear. However, not all animal displays of teeth convey negative acts or emotions. For example, Barbary macaques demonstrate an open mouth display as a sign of playfulness, which likely has similar roots and purposes as the human smile.

See also

References

Further reading 
 
 Ottenheimer, H.J. (2006). The anthropology of language: An introduction to linguistic anthropology. Belmont, CA: Thomson Wadsworh. 
  Cited in: Russell and Fernandez-Dols, eds. (1997).
 Russell and Fernandez-Dols, eds. (1997). The Psychology of Facial Expression. Cambridge. .

External links 

 BBC News: Scanner shows unborn babies smile

Facial expressions
Laughter
Mouth
Happiness
Social influence